Xhelal Miroçi (born 13 March 1983) is a German–Albanian football player and coach.

References

1983 births
Living people
German people of Albanian descent
Kosovan emigrants to Germany
Association football midfielders
Kosovan footballers
German footballers
FC Memmingen players
KF Vllaznia Shkodër players
Kategoria Superiore players
Kosovan expatriate footballers
Expatriate footballers in Germany
Kosovan expatriate sportspeople in Germany
Expatriate footballers in Albania
Kosovan expatriate sportspeople in Albania
SpVgg Kaufbeuren players
TSG Thannhausen players